The IIT Campus School is a primary and secondary school at the Indian Institute of Technology Bombay, Mumbai, India, that provides education to the children of IIT employees.

History
Campus School began as a primary school on 29 June 1976. V to X standard was added by 1986 with 100% results in X std in 1986, 1987 and 1988. The junior college classes FYJC or XI Std and SYJC or XII Std were started in science stream under Principal Chandra Rao in 1989. The Primary to JC complex has about 400 students on its roll, 35 teachers and 20 non-teaching staff.

Admission and tuition
Admission to all classes is restricted to children of IIT employees with some seats made available to the children of NITIE and SAMEER employees.

Fees are Rs 480 per annum for girls, SC, ST children and the children of the employees earning below Rs 5000 per month. For others it is Rs 700 per annum.

References

IIT Bombay
Schools in Mumbai